Deon L. Lacey (born July 18, 1990) is a gridiron football linebacker for the Edmonton Elks of the Canadian Football League (CFL). He played college football at the University of West Alabama. He has also been a member of the Dallas Cowboys, Edmonton Eskimos, Miami Dolphins, and Buffalo Bills.

Early years
Lacey was born on July 18, 1990 in Indianapolis, Indiana. He lettered in football and track and field at Hueytown High School in Hueytown, Alabama. He was named All-state, Super All-Metro, Old Spice Player of the Year, and Defensive Player of the Year while playing for the Golden Gophers football team. He also set the school record in the 400 metres with a time of 52.57.

College career
Lacey played football for the West Alabama Tigers from 2008 to 2012. He was named the Gulf South Conference Defensive Player of the Year in 2011, recording 97 tackles, nine tackles for loss, four sacks, two interceptions, four pass deflections, and a fumble recovery. He finished his college career with 267 tackles, nine sacks, six forced fumbles and five interceptions.

Professional career

Dallas Cowboys 
Lacey was signed by the Dallas Cowboys of the NFL on April 28, 2013 after going undrafted in the 2013 NFL Draft. Lacey played in three preseason games for the Cowboys, contributing with five tackles. He was released by the Cowboys on August 27, 2013.

Edmonton Eskimos 
He signed with the CFL's Edmonton Eskimos on February 26, 2014. Lacey made an immediate impact with the Eskimos on special teams and increasingly became an important member of their starting defensive unit. In three years with the Eskimos, Lacey played in all 54 games, racking up 144 defensive tackles, 68 special teams tackles, 7 sacks, 3 interceptions, 4 forced fumbles and 1 touchdown.

In December 2016, Lacey had workouts with various NFL teams, including; the Minnesota Vikings, New England Patriots, Detroit Lions, Denver Broncos, Green Bay Packers, Kansas City Chiefs, and Cincinnati Bengals. On January 3, 2017 the Eskimos granted Lacey an early release so he would be eligible to sign with an NFL team.

Miami Dolphins 
On January 10, 2017, Lacey signed a reserve/future contract with the Miami Dolphins. He was waived on September 2, 2017.

Buffalo Bills 
On September 3, 2017, Lacey was claimed off waivers by the Buffalo Bills. He was waived by the Bills on October 18, 2017, but was re-signed the next day. He finished the 2017 season having contributed nine tackles. In the following off-season, on February 20, 2019, Lacey signed a one-year contract extension with the Bills. Lacey appeared in all four preseason games in 2019, and totaled 18 tackles. He was released during final roster cuts on August 31, 2019.

Miami Dolphins
On September 1, 2019, Lacey was claimed off waivers by the Miami Dolphins.

Saskatchewan Roughriders
Lacey signed with the Saskatchewan Roughriders of the CFL on May 21, 2020. After the CFL canceled the 2020 season due to the COVID-19 pandemic, Lacey chose to opt-out of his contract with the Roughriders on August 25, 2020.

Buffalo Bills (second stint)
On September 17, 2020, Lacey was signed to the Buffalo Bills practice squad. He was elevated to the active roster on September 19 for the team's week 2 game against the Miami Dolphins, and reverted to the practice squad after the game. He was elevated again on September 26 for the team's week 3 game against the Los Angeles Rams, and reverted to the practice squad again following the game. He was promoted to the active roster on October 12, 2020. He was waived on October 27 and re-signed to the practice squad the next day. He was released on January 1, 2021.

Saskatchewan Roughriders (second stint)
Lacey re-signed with the Roughriders on June 15, 2021.

Edmonton Elks

Lacey returned to the Edmonton Elks in free agency on February 8, 2022.

References

External links
Just Sports Stats
Edmonton Eskimos bio

1990 births
Living people
African-American players of American football
African-American players of Canadian football
American football linebackers
Buffalo Bills players
Canadian football linebackers
Dallas Cowboys players
Edmonton Elks players
Hueytown High School alumni
Miami Dolphins players
Players of American football from Indianapolis
Saskatchewan Roughriders players
West Alabama Tigers football players